In mathematics, the Euler–Poisson–Darboux equation is the partial differential equation

 

This equation is named for Siméon Poisson, Leonhard Euler, and Gaston Darboux. It plays an important role in solving the classical wave equation.

This equation is related to

 

References

External links

Differential calculus
Partial differential equations
Leonhard Euler